The BMC Racing Cup is a multi-round mountain bike racing series with different venues in Switzerland. The discipline in which national and international riders compete is the Olympic Cross-country (XCO).

In 2014 Lenzerheide hosted one of the races of the BMC Racing Cup, and the same track was used again for the third round of the 2015 UCI Mountain Bike World Cup.

Calendar
Dates and venues from 2009 to 2015 are:

2009 season

Round #1  Lugano - Tesserete (April 18).
Round #2  Solothurn (May 9).
Round #3  Gränichen (June 7).
Round #4  Winterthur (June 21).
Round #5  Engelberg - Titlis (June 28).
Round #6  Plaffeien (July 19).
Round #7  Bern (August 9).
Round #8  Muttenz (August 23).

2010 season

Round #1  Buchs (March 28).
Round #2  Lugano - Tesserete (April 11).
Round #3  Solothurn (May 8).
Round #4  Plaffeien (May 30).
Round #5  Champéry (June 6).
Round #6  Engelberg - Titlis (June 20).
Round #7  Flims (July 3).
Round #8  Muttenz (August 22).

2011 season

Round #1  Schaan (March 27).
Round #2  Lugano - Tesserete (April 10).
Round #3  Solothurn (May 7).
Round #4  Gränichen (June 5).
Round #5  Engelberg - Titlis (June 12).
Round #6  Chur (June 26).
Round #7  Muttenz (August 28).

2012 season

Round #1  Buchs (April 1).
Round #2  Lugano - Tesserete (April 22).
Round #3  Solothurn (May 5).
Round #4  Gränichen (June 17).
Round #5  Davos (July 15).
Round #6  Basel - Muttenz (August 26).

2013 season

Round #1  Schaan (April 7).
Round #2  Lugano - Tesserete (April 14).
Round #3  Solothurn (May 4).
Round #4  Gränichen (June 9).
Round #5  Davos (August 4).
Round #6  Basel - Muttenz (August 24).

2014 season

Round #1  Buchs (March 23).
Round #2  Lugano - Tesserete (April 6).
Round #3  Solothurn (May 10).
Round #4  Gränichen (June 15).
Round #5  Montsevelier (July 6).
Round #6  Lenzerheide (July 13).
Round #7  Basel - Muttenz (August 17).

2015 season

Round #1  Schaan (April 12).
Round #2  Lugano - Tesserete (April 26).
Round #3  Solothurn (May 9).
Round #4  Gränichen (June 7).
Round #5  Yverdon (June 28).
Round #6  Montsevelier (July 12).
Round #7  Basel - Muttenz (August 16).

Highlights

2013 Season on YouTube
Round #1  Schaan (April 7).
Round #2  Lugano - Tesserete (April 14).
Round #3  Solothurn (May 4).
Round #4  Gränichen (June 9).
Men Elite 
Women Elite 
Round #5  Davos (August 4).
Round #6  Basel - Muttenz (August 24).
Men Elite 
Women Elite

2014 Season on YouTube
Round #1  Buchs (March 23).
Men Elite 
Women Elite 
Round #2  Lugano - Tesserete (April 6).
Round #3  Solothurn (May 10).
Men Elite 
Women Elite 
Round #4  Gränichen (June 15).
Men Elite 
Women Elite 
Round #5  Montsevelier (July 6).
Men Elite 
 Round #6  Lenzerheide (July 13).
Building the track 
Race test 
Round #7  Basel - Muttenz (August 17).
Men Elite 
Women Elite

2015 Season on YouTube
Round #1  Schaan (April 12).
Round #2  Lugano - Tesserete (April 26).
Men Elite 
Women Elite 
Round #3  Solothurn (May 9).
Men Elite 
Women Elite 
Round #4  Gränichen (June 7).
Men Elite 
Women Elite 
Round #5  Yverdon (June 28).
Men Elite 
Round #6  Montsevelier (July 12).
Round #7  Basel - Muttenz (August 16).

References

External links
 BMC Racing Cup Homepage 
 Event-Serie: BMC Racing Cup 2014
 Event-Serie: BMC Racing Cup 2015
 BMC Racing Cup 2015

Cycle racing series
Mountain biking in Europe
Mountain biking events
Cycle races in Switzerland